Catrien Eijken (born 29 June 1961) is a former synchronized swimmer from The Netherlands.

References 

1961 births
Living people
Dutch synchronized swimmers
Olympic synchronized swimmers of the Netherlands
Synchronized swimmers at the 1984 Summer Olympics
People from Singapore